The 1884 Lehigh football team represented Lehigh University in the 1884 college football season. The team finished with an overall record of 0–4.

Schedule

References

Lehigh
Lehigh Mountain Hawks football seasons
College football winless seasons
Lehigh football